Kenneth Eugene Deal (August 30, 1927 — August 12, 1993) was an American pitcher and manager in minor league baseball. As a pitcher, he twice won more than 20 games (1947 in the Carolina League and 1949 in the Southeastern League). During a 16-year career he won 121 games, losing 95 (.560) and compiled an earned run average of 3.24.

Deal managed in the Boston Red Sox farm system from 1957 to 1960, then worked in the New York Mets' minor league organization when Boston's then-farm system director, Johnny Murphy, switched teams after the 1960 season. His managerial record was 430–467 (.479), with one championship (the 1958 Waterloo Hawks of the Midwest League).

Ken Deal died at age 65 in 1993.

External links
Baseball Reference

1927 births
1993 deaths
Atlanta Crackers players
Burlington Bees players
Fayetteville Highlanders players
Greensboro Patriots players
Hartford Chiefs players
Kingsport Cherokees players
Lafayette Red Sox players
Minor league baseball managers
Quincy Jets players
Raleigh Capitals players
Reidsville Luckies players
Salinas Mets players
Waterloo Hawks (baseball) players
Cocoa Rookie League Mets players